Anna Maria Kinberg Batra (born 14 April 1970) is a Swedish politician who served as Leader of the Opposition and Leader of the Moderate Party from January 2015 to October 2017. She was a Member of the Riksdag for Stockholm County from September 2006 to September 2018. She served as parliamentary leader from October 2010 to January 2015.

On 25 August 2017, Kinberg Batra announced her resignation as party leader; she was succeeded by Ulf Kristersson on 1 October 2017. In September 2017, she said that she would leave the political arena.

She took office as Governor of Stockholm County on 1 March 2023 following her appointment by the Government of Sweden on 2 February 2023.

Early life 
Anna Kinberg was born in Skärholmen. In 1974, Kinberg and her family moved to Rotterdam, Netherlands, as her father worked for Merrill Lynch's Amsterdam office. Kinberg Batra speaks fluent Dutch after her years in the country. They moved back to Sweden in 1980, settling in Djursholm where Kinberg Batra spent the rest of her upbringing.

Relatives 
Kinberg Batra is a member of the Kinberg family from Västra Götaland County. Her parents are commodity analyst Johan S. Kinberg and chemistry engineer Sarah Kinberg (née Lundgren). Her grandfather was director Hilding Kinberg and her great-great-grandfather was professor Hjalmar Kinberg.

Education 
Kinberg Batra went to high school at Danderyds gymnasium, where she studied natural sciences. After high school, she studied foreign languages and political science at Stockholm University between 1989 and 1991. She graduated from Stockholm School of Economics in 2000, having studied part-time there from 1991.

Political career 

Kinberg Batra joined the Moderate Youth League in 1983. During the internal fights within the youth league in the beginning of the 1990s, she belonged to the liberal phalanx and supported Ulf Kristersson as chairman.

In 1993, she worked as political advisor to Prime Minister Carl Bildt at the Government offices. She has also worked as editor at Svenska Dagbladet in 1994, and 1996. From 1995 to 1996, she was political secretary at the office of the Moderate Party in the European Parliament, and from 1998 to 2000, she served as project leader. From 2000 to 2005, she was communication consult at Prime PR. Concurrently, she ran her own consulting business. From 2005 to 2006, she was head of information at the Stockholm Chamber of Commerce.

She was active in student politics as chairman of the Stockholm University Student Union in 1994, as member of the board of the Moderate Youth League from 1995 to 1998, and as the first female chairman of the Moderate Youth League in Stockholm County from 1996 to 1998. From 2004 to 2011, she was a member of the board of activity center Fryshuset. Since 2011, she has been a member of the executive board of the Moderate Party.

Elected representative 
She has also been an elected member of the Stockholm County Council and the municipal council in Nacka Municipality. Prior to the 2006 general election she worked at the Stockholm Chamber of Commerce, and prior to that she worked in different companies as a public relations consultant. She has authored the book Indien – från stackare till stormakt ("India – From Wretch to Great Power", Timbro, 2005).

Kinberg became known to the general public when she stated that "people from Stockholm are more intelligent than people from rural areas" in her 1998 election campaign. In 2014, she apologized for this statement and said that "it is still the stupidest thing I've said publicly".

In the Riksdag from 2006, she was chairman of the Committee on European Union Affairs from 2007 to 2010, and chairman of the Committee on Finance from 2010 to 2014.

Leader of the Moderate Party 
Following the defeat of the Moderate Party in the general election in September 2014, Kinberg Batra was de jure took leadership of the party. On 9 December 2014, the Moderate Party's nomination committee nominated Anna Kinberg Batra to succeed Fredrik Reinfeldt as party leader. She was elected to the position at the party congress on 10 January 2015, becoming the party's first female leader.

She faced criticism from voters and from within the Moderate Party after the December agreement, which made it possible for Prime Minister Stefan Löfven's centre-left minority government coalition to continue in office. On 9 October 2015, following the Christian Democrats' departure from the agreement, Kinberg Batra announced that the agreement was now dissolved.

On 25 August 2017, she announced that she would resign the leadership of the Moderate Party, owing to heavy criticism from within the party. She was succeeded by Ulf Kristersson on 1 October 2017.

Personal life 
She has been married to comedian David Batra since 2002. They have one daughter and live in Nacka, Stockholm. She is fluent in French and proficient in Dutch.

References

External links 

Riksdagen: Anna Kinberg Batra (m)

|-

1970 births
Living people
Members of the Riksdag from the Moderate Party
Leaders of the Moderate Party
Politicians from Stockholm
Stockholm School of Economics alumni
Stockholm University alumni
Swedish expatriates in the Netherlands
Women members of the Riksdag
21st-century Swedish women politicians